Mark Kenneth Deyell (born March 26, 1976) is a Canadian former professional ice hockey centre who was drafted by the Toronto Maple Leafs in the National Hockey League (NHL). As of 2020, Deyell ranks 4th in the Saskatoon Blades all-time leaders in points and 80th in the Western Hockey League all-time leaders in assists. He led the Western Hockey League with 159 points in its 1995–96 Season, earning the Bob Clarke Trophy; since then, no other player has surpassed this single-season performance.

Playing career
Deyell played major junior hockey with the Saskatoon Blades of the Western Hockey League. While playing with the Saskatoon Blades, Deyell was selected with the 126th overall pick in the 1994 NHL entry draft by the Toronto Maple Leafs. In his final season with the Saskatoon Blades, Deyell scored 159 points in only 69 games played, outscoring star NHL player Jarome Iginla. He earned the Bob Clarke Trophy that season for being the top scorer. After his last season with the Saskatoon Blades, Deyell played with the St. John's Maple Leafs for three seasons.

In April 1999, Deyell took a stick to his right eye during an AHL playoff game, when a player on the opposing team was following through on a shot, ending his career.

Career statistics

Awards
 WHL East First All-Star Team – 1996

References

External links

1976 births
Living people
Ice hockey people from Saskatchewan
Saskatoon Blades players
Sportspeople from Regina, Saskatchewan
Toronto Maple Leafs draft picks
Hamilton Bulldogs (AHL) players
St. John's Maple Leafs players
Canadian ice hockey centres